Marcos Martín de la Fuente (born 17 September 1968), known simply as Marcos, is a Spanish retired footballer who played as a defensive midfielder.

He amassed La Liga totals of 402 games and 25 goals over the course of 15 seasons, representing mainly in the competition Mallorca (eight years) and Sevilla (six).

Club career
Born in Valencia, Marcos grew in RCD Mallorca's youth system. He made his first-team – and La Liga – debut on 6 March 1988, starting in a 1–0 away loss against Real Betis as the season ended in relegation. He played a further two campaigns with the Balearic Islands club in the top flight, scoring his first goals in the competition on 8 April 1990 in the 5–1 home win over Cádiz CF.

Marcos joined Sevilla FC in the summer of 1991. He never appeared in less than 32 league games during his spell in Andalusia, his best output occurring in 1994–95 as he netted four times in 33 matches to help his team to the fifth position; additionally, he took part in six UEFA Cup contests with the side, all in the 1995–96 edition.

From 1997 to 2000, Marcos represented CP Mérida, being relegated twice in three years. Aged 32, he then returned to his first club, competing a further five seasons in the Spanish top tier. He retired in June 2005, being immediately appointed as coordinator to the youth system.

Honours
Copa del Rey: 2002–03

See also
List of La Liga players (400+ appearances)

References

External links

1968 births
Living people
Spanish footballers
Footballers from Valencia (city)
Association football midfielders
La Liga players
Segunda División players
Segunda División B players
Tercera División players
RCD Mallorca B players
RCD Mallorca players
Sevilla FC players
CP Mérida footballers